Southern Gothic is the debut album by Atlanta-based hip hop/rock band The Constellations. It was released on June 21, 2010 and features cameo appearances from Cee-Lo Green and Asher Roth. "Perfect Day" has been featured in films and TV shows such as Horrible Bosses, Chuck and Suits.

Track listing
 "Setback" - 5:23
 "Perfect Day" - 4:24
 "Love Is a Murder (Feat. Cee-Lo) - 3:46
 "December" - 4:11
 "Take a Ride" - 4:57
 "We're Here to Save the Day (Feat. Asher Roth)" - 3:29
 "Felicia" - 3:29
 "Step Right Up" - 9:15
 "What I See" - 5:42
 "Weighing Me Down" 3:59
 "On My Way Up" - 5:40

References

http://pitchfork.com/reviews/albums/14382-southern-gothic/
http://www.amazon.com/Southern-Gothic-Constellations/dp/B003KZZ4H6
https://www.spin.com/2010/05/breaking-out-constellations/

2010 debut albums